Rosenborg Ballklub is an association football club based in Trondheim, Norway. Twenty people have been manager of Rosenborg since 1965, when the position was created. Rosenborg reached the First Division (from 1992 the Norwegian Premier League) in 1967 and has played at that level ever since, except in 1978. Nils Arne Eggen is the club's longest-serving manager, having led the team for 22 seasons in five spurs between 1971 and 2010. He won the premiership in his inaugural season and has led the team for 14 of the club's 23 league-winning seasons. Eggen is also the one with the most matches as manager of Rosenborg, with 729 matches, while Tor Røste Fossen and Jon Jönsson, who are split second on the list, only were in charge of the team for 89 matches. Erik Hamrén managed the team for 85 matches between 2008 and 2010, before he took over the Swedish national team. Per Joar Hansen, who led the team for one season in 2006, has been the manager since 2013.

Managers
The following is a list of Rosenborg BK's managers. It lists the manager's name, nationality, period, number of games played (P), top domestic league titles and other honors. When only a year is given, it indicates that the manager started before the beginning of the season or left after the end of the season.

References
Bibliography

Notes

Managers
 
Rosenborg